Bright Future is a 2022 Chinese political drama television series directed by Kong Sheng, Mao Junlin and Wang Hong, and starring Hu Ge, Wu Yue, Zhang Xincheng, Huang Lei, and . The series tells the story of Mei Xiaoge, the county committee secretary, and his colleagues who unite the people to build Guangming County. The television series started airing on CCTV-1 on 7 December 2022.

Cast

Main
 Hu Ge as Mei Xiaoge, deputy party secretary and magistrate and future party secretary of Guangming County.
 Liu Haoran as young Mei Xiaoge.
 Wu Yue as Ai Xianzhi, deputy party secretary of Guangming County. 
 Zhang Xincheng as section member of the Office of Guangming County People's Government.
 Huang Lei as party secretary of Guangming County. 
  as deputy party secretary and magistrate of Jiuyuan County.

Supporting
 Liu Tao as Li Tang, head of the Publicity Department of the CCP Guangming County Committee.
 Bao Bei'er as Xiao Zeng or Little Zeng
  as Qiao Shengli
  as San Bao
 You Zhiyong as Lao Qiu or Old Qiu
 , party secretary of Luquan Township.
  as Li Baoping
  as Zhou Liangshun, former deputy party secretary of Guangming County.
 Zhu Yuchen as Zheng San, chairman of East Asia Star Energy Group.
 Wan Qian as Qiao Mai, an official from Xinchuan City.
  as Jiang Xia, section member of the Office of Guangming County People's Government.
 Huang Jue as Jiang Xinmin
  as He Yaping
  as Ma Guangqun
  as Li Guochun
  as Lao Guai or Old Guai
 Mao Hai as Bao Gen
 Dong Yong as Director Guo
  as Duan Yingjiu
  as mother of Bao Gen
  as mother of Xiao Lin
  as calligrapher
  as Gu Wenzhang
  as Liu Qiaozhen
  as Liu Yajun
  as Yuan Hao
  as Leader Sun
  as Li Donglin

Production
The television series was shot on locations in Hefei and Huainan between May 16 and July 28, 2022.

References

External links
 
 

Political drama television series
2022 Chinese television series debuts
2022 Chinese television series endings
Television series by Daylight Entertainment